Tippapura also spelled as Thippapura, is a village in the Mundargi taluk of Gadag district in the Indian state of Karnataka. Tippapura is located south to district headquarters Gadag and Taluka headquarters Mundargi.

Importance
Tippapura is famous for the ancient Tippapura Fort located in the village.And famous Shankar bhagwan math

Climate
The climate here is considered to be a local steppe climate. In Tippapura, there is little rainfall throughout the year. The climate here is classified as BSh by the Köppen-Geiger system. The average annual temperature is 25.6 °C in Tippapura. Precipitation here averages 496 mm.

See also
Singatalur
Hammigi
Korlahalli
Mundargi
Gadag
Koppal

References

External links
 http://www.gadag.nic.in

Villages in Gadag district